Robert Ker may refer to:

Robert Ker, 1st Earl of Roxburghe (1570? – 1650)
Robert Ker (1634–1680) Scots Worthy, Robert Ker of Kersland
Robert Ker, 3rd Earl of Roxburghe (c. 1658–1682)
Robert Ker, 4th Earl of Roxburghe (c. 1677–1696)
Robert Ker, 2nd Duke of Roxburghe  (c.  1709–1755)
Robert Ker (1824–1879), first Auditor General of the Colony and then the Province of British Columbia

See also
Robert Kerr (disambiguation)
Robert Ker Porter